Jelly roll may refer to:

 Swiss roll, a cake also known as jelly roll, roll cake, cream roll, roulade, Swiss log

Entertainment
 Jelly Roll (rapper) (born 1986), rapper from Nashville
 Jelly Roll Morton (1890–1941), jazz musician
 "Jelly Roll Blues", a 1924 jazz fox-trot composed by Jelly Roll Morton
 "Jelly Roll", a song on the album Blue Murder by Blue Murder
 "Jelly Roll", a composition on the album Mingus Ah Um by Charles Mingus
 Jelly Roll, the pet dog on the children's television show, Jibber Jabber
 Jelly Roll (poetry collection), a 2003 poetry collection by Kevin Young

Finance
 Jelly roll (options), an options trading strategy

Science and technology
 Jelly roll fold, a type of beta barrel protein domain structure 
 Jelly roll (battery), a type of battery construction